The 75th Boat Race took place on 24 March 1923.  Held annually, the Boat Race is a side-by-side rowing race between crews from the Universities of Oxford and Cambridge along the River Thames.  Cambridge's crew was marginally heavier than Oxford's, the latter included an Olympic silver medallist.  Cambridge went into the race as reigning champions, having won the previous year's race.   In this year's race, umpired by former rower Frederick I. Pitman, Oxford won by three-quarters of a length (the narrowest margin of victory since 1913) in a time of 20 minutes 54 seconds, securing their first win in five years.  The victory took the overall record in the event to 40–34 in their favour.

Background

The Boat Race is a side-by-side rowing competition between the University of Oxford (sometimes referred to as the "Dark Blues") and the University of Cambridge (sometimes referred to as the "Light Blues").  The race was first held in 1829, and since 1845 has taken place on the  Championship Course on the River Thames in southwest London.  The rivalry is a major point of honour between the two universities and followed throughout the United Kingdom and worldwide.  Cambridge went into the race as reigning champions, having won the 1922 race by one length, while Oxford led overall with 39 victories to Cambridge's 34 (excluding the "dead heat" of 1877).

Oxford were coached by G. C. Bourne who had rowed for the university in the 1882 and 1883 races, Harcourt Gilbey Gold (Dark Blue president for the 1900 race and four-time Blue) and E. D. Horsfall (who had rowed in the three races prior to the First World War).  Cambridge's coaches were Harald Peake (who had participated in the Peace Regattas of 1919), G. L. Thomson and David Alexander Wauchope (who had rowed in the 1895 race).  For the fifteenth year the umpire was old Etonian Frederick I. Pitman who rowed for Cambridge in the 1884, 1885 and 1886 races.

According to author and former Oxford rower G. C. Drinkwater, the Oxford trial eights were "of a better average than those of the preceding years" and after they arrived at Putney, the Dark Blue crew "improved rapidly up to the day of the race".  Conversely he reported that Cambridge suffered "a dearth of good heavy-wrights" and that the crew "were not of very high class".

Crews

Oxford's crew included four rowers with Boat Race experience, including P. C. Mallam and Guy Oliver Nickalls who were both participating in their third consecutive event. Nickalls was a silver medallist in the men's eight at the 1920 Summer Olympics. Cambridge's crew included three rowers who had represented the university in the previous year's race: K. N. Craig, B. G. Ivory and David Collet. Two of the participants in the race were registered as non-British: Cambridge's Kane and Mellen were from the United States.

Race

Oxford won the toss and elected to start from the Surrey station, handing the Middlesex side of the river to Cambridge.  Umpire Pitman started the race in calm conditions at 5:10 p.m.  Apparently disrupted by the wake of a nearby moored steamer, Oxford's start was poor, allowing Cambridge to lead by a canvas' length after a minute.  Despite this, Oxford had drawn level a minute later, to hold a small lead by the time the crews commenced the long bend.  By the Mile Post, the Dark Blues held a quarter-length lead and by Hammersmith Bridge had extended this to three-quarters of a length.  Spurting at The Doves pub, Oxford began to draw clear of Cambridge.

By Chiswick Eyot, Oxford accelerated away from the Light Blues and were two lengths clear before a spurt from Cambridge ahead of Barnes Bridge reduced the lead to a length and a quarter by the time the crews passed below the bridge.  With the bend in the river in their favour, and pushing hard, Cambridge slowly gained on the Dark Blues but could not level terms.  Oxford passed the finishing post with a lead of three-quarters of a length in a time of 20 minutes 54 seconds.  It was their first victory in five years, the narrowest winning margin since the 1913 race and the slowest winning time since the 1920 race.  The win took the overall record in the event to 40–34 in their favour.

References
Notes

Bibliography

External links
 Official website
 Montage of the Oxford crew from Getty Images

1923 in English sport
1923 sports events in London
The Boat Race
March 1923 sports events